Mitchell Anthony Roberts (born 16 September 2000) is an English professional footballer who plays as a defender for Solihull Moors on loan from  club Birmingham City.

He made his Football League debut while on loan to Harrogate Town of League Two in 2021, and spent the second half of the 2021–22 season with another League Two club, Carlisle United. He moved on loan to National League team Oldham Athletic for the first half of the 2022–23 season.

Early and personal life
Roberts was born in Hagley, Worcestershire, where he attended Haybridge High School. He was a childhood fan of West Bromwich Albion.

Career

Early career
Roberts joined Birmingham City's Academy as a 10-year-old in 2011, having previously played Sunday League football, and took up a two-year scholarship in July 2017. His first year was interrupted by a knee injury, but he was able to move into the development squad in his second. He was offered a two-year professional contract in March 2019, and signed it in June.

Rumours in the 2019 summer transfer window linked Roberts with a move to then Premier League champions Manchester City and Scottish Premiership champions Celtic, and it was reported that Birmingham were willing to sell "at the right price". He did not leave, played 18 times for Birmingham's under-23 team during the abbreviated 2019–20 season, and signed a two-year professional contract in July 2020.

He was used in pre-season friendlies ahead of the 2020–21 season, but was not listed among those allocated a squad number.

Harrogate Town loan
Roberts joined League Two newcomers Harrogate Town on 8 January 2021 on loan until the end of the 2020–21 season. He made his club and Football League debut the next day, starting at left back in a 2–1 defeat away to Cambridge United. He played for 54 minutes, during which he received a yellow card for a bad tackle, before being replaced by Jay Williams because of a hamstring injury. He received treatment at Birmingham before returning to Harrogate towards the end of March, and next appeared in the first team on 20 April, playing the whole of a 3–0 home defeat. He played twice more, finishing his loan spell with four appearances.

Return to Birmingham
Roberts made his first-team debut for Birmingham in the EFL Cup second-round match at home to Fulham. Starting in a three-man defence alongside the experienced George Friend and fellow debutant Dion Sanderson, he played the whole of the 2–0 defeat. Roberts made his first Championship appearance on 7 November 2021 when, with five senior defenders unavailable through injury, he started on the left of a back three in a 2–1 defeat at home to Reading.

Carlisle United loan
Having made no further appearances for Birmingham, Roberts signed on loan for League Two club Carlisle United on 31 January 2022. He made his debut on 12 February, starting in a back three in a 2–2 draw away to Colchester United described by the News and Star as a "grim struggle". He finished the season with six appearances.

Oldham Athletic loan
Roberts signed for National League club Oldham Athletic on 25 August 2022, on loan until 1 January 2023. He made his debut the next day in the starting eleven for the match at home to Aldershot, which Oldham won with a stoppage-time goal. Manager John Sheridan described him as "excellent, very elegant, technically very good, comfortable on the ball." He was a regular in the starting eleven until a knee injury sustained in an FA Cup tie against Chester in mid-October kept him out for the rest of the loan spell.

Solihull Moors loan
Roberts joined another National League club, Solihull Moors, on 30 January 2023 on loan until the end of the season.

Career statistics

References

2000 births
Living people
People from Bromsgrove District
English footballers
Association football defenders
Birmingham City F.C. players
Harrogate Town A.F.C. players
Carlisle United F.C. players
Oldham Athletic A.F.C. players
Solihull Moors F.C. players
English Football League players
National League (English football) players